Tomochika Tsuboi (born February 19, 1974, in Kōtō, Tokyo, Japan) is a Japanese baseball outfielder. He previously played in the NPB for 13 seasons, starting in 1998. His professional career started with the Hanshin Tigers, but he was traded to the Nippon-Ham Fighters for Toshihiro Noguchi after the 2002 season. His stint with Nippon Ham was his longest with the same team, lasting through 2010. He then played briefly for the Orix Buffaloes, his final season in Japanese pro ball. He declined a coaching position with the Fighters and since 2012 has played in various American independent leagues.

Biography

NPB statistics

External links
Tsubochika Spirits Official blog 

1974 births
Living people
Baseball people from Tokyo
Japanese expatriate baseball players in the United States
Aoyama Gakuin University alumni
Nippon Professional Baseball outfielders
Hanshin Tigers players
Nippon Ham Fighters players
Hokkaido Nippon-Ham Fighters players
Orix Buffaloes players
San Rafael Pacifics players
Gary SouthShore RailCats players
Rio Grande Valley WhiteWings players
Edinburg Roadrunners players
Lancaster Barnstormers players
Japanese baseball coaches
Nippon Professional Baseball coaches